Legends II may refer to:

Legends II (book), a 2003 anthology of fantasy short stories
X-Men Legends II: Rise of Apocalypse, a 2005 action role-playing game